Cyperus mutisii is a species of sedge that is native to parts of southern parts of North America, throughout Central America and in northern parts of South America.

See also 
 List of Cyperus species

References 

mutisii
Plants described in 1854
Flora of Bolivia
Flora of Arizona
Flora of Colombia
Flora of Belize
Flora of Costa Rica
Flora of the Dominican Republic
Flora of Ecuador
Flora of Guyana
Flora of Guatemala
Flora of Haiti
Flora of Honduras
Flora of Jamaica
Flora of Mexico
Flora of Nicaragua
Flora of Panama
Flora of Peru
Flora of Puerto Rico
Flora of Venezuela
Flora without expected TNC conservation status